Platyrrhinus is a genus of leaf-nosed bats in the tribe Stenodermatini of family Phyllostomidae. Twenty one species are known:

Alberico's broad-nosed bat, Platyrrhinus albericoi
Slender broad-nosed bat, Platyrrhinus angustirostris
Darien broad-nosed bat, Platyrrhinus aquilus
Eldorado broad-nosed bat, Platyrrhinus aurarius
Short-headed broad-nosed bat, Platyrrhinus brachycephalus
Choco broad-nosed bat, Platyrrhinus chocoensis
Thomas's broad-nosed bat, Platyrrhinus dorsalis
Brown-bellied broad-nosed bat, Platyrrhinus fusciventris
Guianan broad-nosed bat, Platyrrhinus guianensis
Heller's broad-nosed bat, Platyrrhinus helleri
Incan broad-nosed bat, Platyrrhinus incarum
Buffy broad-nosed bat, Platyrrhinus infuscus
Platyrrhinus ismaeli
White-lined broad-nosed bat, Platyrrhinus lineatus
Quechua broad-nosed bat, Platyrrhinus masu
Matapalo broad-nosed bat, Platyrrhinus matapalensis
Geoffroy's rayed bat, Platyrrhinus nigellus
Western broad-nosed bat, Platyrrhinus nitelinea
Recife broad-nosed bat, Platyrrhinus recifinus
Shadowy broad-nosed bat, Platyrrhinus umbratus
Greater broad-nosed bat, Platyrrhinus vittatus

References

 
Bat genera
Taxa named by Henri Louis Frédéric de Saussure